James Taylor Pryce, D.D. (1936–2010) was a Canadian Suffragan Bishop.

Pryce was educated at Bishop's University, Lennoxville  and ordained in 1963. After a curacy at The Church of the Ascension Toronto he was Priest in charge of Brooklin.   He was a suffragan bishop in the Diocese of Toronto from 1985 to 2000.

References 

Bishop's University alumni
Anglican bishops of Toronto
20th-century Anglican Church of Canada bishops
21st-century Anglican priests
1936 births
2010 deaths